Michelle Jones-Watson, most commonly known as MJ, is a fictional character portrayed by Zendaya in the Marvel Cinematic Universe (MCU) film franchise, an original character within the media franchise that pays homage to Mary Jane "MJ" Watson, a recurring love interest of Spider-Man in comic books and various media.

She is depicted as a smart, snarky classmate of Peter Parker in Spider-Man: Homecoming (2017), and becomes his love interest in the sequel Spider-Man: Far From Home (2019), a unique aspect for original characters within the MCU franchise and upon Spider-Man feature films preceding it.  She returns in Spider-Man: No Way Home (2021), helping Peter, Ned, and Doctor Strange to capture multiple villains that have entered their universe from the multiverse. Her romantic involvement in Peter's personal life would eventually be undone due to Strange's casting of a spell that permanently erased the world's memory of Parker's civilian persona, including the loss of his previous bonds he forged with his friends, loved ones, and allies. She received positive reviews after Homecoming's release as a strong female supporting cast member, additionally receiving the Saturn Award for Best Supporting Actress for her role in Far From Home.

Creation and concept

According to Spider-Man: Homecoming co-screenwriter John Francis Daley, MJ was intended as a reinvention of Mary Jane Watson. While her nickname reveal was an homage to the supporting character within the comic books and other Spider-Man media, Marvel Studios president Kevin Feige confirmed she is an original Marvel Cinematic Universe character. Feige added: "Peter's had a lot of friends over the years in the comics, and a lot of schoolmates and characters he’s interacted with. It wasn't just Mary Jane Watson; it wasn't just Gwen Stacy; it wasn’t just Harry Osborn. So we were very interested in the other characters, and that’s where Liz came from and that’s where the version of the character Michelle came from." Jon Watts, director of  Spider-Man: Homecoming, Spider-Man: Far From Home and Spider-Man: No Way Home, likened the character to Ally Sheedy's Allison Reynolds from The Breakfast Club (1985) and Linda Cardellini's Lindsay Weir from Freaks and Geeks (1999–2000).

The character's full name is Michelle Jones-Watson, which was first revealed in Spider-Man: No Way Home. Until that point, she had been referred to once as Michelle and primarily known by the nickname MJ; although the name "Michelle Jones" had been used in an article by Variety, quickly spreading among the press and fans, the name was not used in any official media until No Way Home.

Portrayal and characterization 

MJ is portrayed by actress Zendaya in the Marvel Cinematic Universe as a classmate of Peter Parker at Midtown School of Science and Technology and a teammate on the academic decathlon team. She is depicted as politically active with critical views, and a loner who claims to eschew friendship. Zendaya described the character as "very dry, awkward, intellectual". This sometimes manifests itself in the form of deadpan sarcasm, as when she calls Peter and Ned "losers" for ogling his crush, Liz from afar. Among her unusual hobbies is attending detention simply to "sketch people in crisis."

Unlike previous supporting female characters within Spider-Man films, such as Mary Jane Watson from the Sam Raimi trilogy and Gwen Stacy from the Amazing Spider-Man films, MJ is neither a romantic interest nor a damsel in distress at the beginning of her character arc. Instead, the character Liz was created initially for the role of romantic interest in a way that tied into Parker's conflict with the Vulture.

In the third film, she is rescued from a fall by Andrew Garfield's incarnation of Spider-Man, prompting an emotional moment for that Spider-Man, in light of his failure to save Gwen Stacy from a similar fate in The Amazing Spider-Man 2.

Fictional character biography

High school life
 
In 2016, Michelle, commonly known as MJ, is introduced as a student at Midtown School of Science and Technology and enjoys mocking her classmates, including Peter Parker. She is given the opportunity to take over from the departing Liz as captain of the Academic Decathlon Team, and begins to open up more with teammates, such as Ned Leeds and Parker. She begins to consider them as her friends.

Resurrection and school vacation 

In 2018, MJ is a victim of the Blip, before being restored to life in 2023. In 2024, MJ attends the school sponsored trip to Europe, where her affections are sought out by Parker and Brad Davis. When she deduces Parker's identity as Spider-Man, MJ helps discover Mysterio's fraudulence as the one who staged the Elemental invasion. Shortly after their trip to Europe, MJ and Parker begin a relationship, and have their first date by swinging in the city, when TheDailyBugle.net J. Jonah Jameson releases a doctored video of Mysterio and Spider-Man, claiming that Spider-Man is responsible for the Battle of London (during which Mysterio was killed) and exposing his identity as Parker.

Multiversal invasion
 
After Parker is framed for the murder of Mysterio, MJ and Parker head back to Parker's aunt May's apartment to escape the press. She is eventually interrogated and taken to custody by the Department of Damage Control along with May, Parker, and Ned. MJ, Parker, and Ned then become infamous, resulting in all their college applications being rejected. In response, Parker consults with Stephen Strange about a spell that would help people forget that he is Spider-Man, which Strange casts for him, but the spell is corrupted when Parker makes changes to the spell after Strange has begun casting it in order to exempt his loved ones from it. Several Spider-Man foes from other universes who know Parker is Spider-Man arrive and attack him as a result of this.

MJ and Ned help Parker track down three of these individuals. After they find out that Strange intends to send them straight back to their realities to certain death, Parker objects and after a struggle, takes the box containing the spell in addition to Strange's sling ring and placing those under MJ and Ned's care, as he opts to restore the villains to their human forms. After learning of May's death by the hands of Norman Osborn's alter ego Green Goblin, MJ and Ned uses the sling ring to try and locate Parker but instead find an alternate version of Parker (later code-named "Peter-Three") in one attempt and another one (later code-named "Peter-Two") in another attempt. Ned and MJ find a bereaved Parker on a rooftop and go to comfort him. They then introduce him to his alternate selves, who also comfort him and provide advice.

In a standoff between the Spider-Men and their villains at the Statue of Liberty, Ned and MJ protect the spell box as the Spider-Men battle their enemies together. MJ falls from the statue after a pumpkin bomb from Osborn detonates on the spell box, destabilizing the spell once more and threatening the fabric of reality. Parker tries to save her but is whisked away by Osborn. She is then ultimately saved by Peter-Three, who had lost his own girlfriend in a similar situation. Before long, Strange fixes the spell due to Parker requesting the former to erase the latter from everyone's memory, sending the other Spider-Men and their villains back to their universes and preserving space-time. Parker and MJ confess their love for each other and kiss passionately before the spell is completed, but not before she and Ned make Parker promise to find them. Parker later considers reintroducing himself to both MJ and Ned, but ultimately decides not to.

Reception

Casting controversy

After the announcement of Zendaya's casting, controversy and speculation centered upon the fact that Zendaya, an African American actress, would be portraying Mary Jane Watson. Media outlets defended Zendaya over the issue, along with the Guardians of the Galaxy film series director James Gunn and Mary Jane co-creator Stan Lee on social media. Zendaya responded to the rumors of her character as Mary Jane by The Hollywood Reporter in an interview saying: "Whenever we were on set, one of us gets some random character name [on the call sheet]. [Bloggers were] like, "Oh they must be so and so." And we just crack up about it, because it's like, 'Whatever you want to think. You'll find out.' It's funny to watch the guessing game. But of course there's going to be outrage over that because for some reason some people just aren't ready. I'm like, "I don't know what America you live in, but from what I see when I walk outside my streets of New York right now, I see lots of diversity and I see the real world and it's beautiful, and that's what should be reflected and that's what is reflected so you're just going to have to get over it." 

Zendaya also confirmed that despite the confusion, she is "100% Michelle" and not Mary Jane as many had speculated. However Michelle is revealed to be nicknamed "MJ" in Homecoming, by which she is known for the entirety of Far From Home, while her full name is revealed to be Michelle Jones-Watson in No Way Home, though she says she goes by Michelle Jones.

Portrayal reaction 
The character of MJ had a positive reception in Homecoming by film critics, with Zendaya referred to as a "scene stealer" in her first major film role, despite her limited screen-time. Caitlin Busch of Inverse  felt thankful that the character was not Mary Jane Watson and opined that the original character works better for the film.

The character has also received positive feedback from a feminist perspective, especially in Spider-Man: Far From Home. Karen Han of Polygon felt that the character was a positive representation of strong female characters while additionally Vanity Fair noted how MJ was not portrayed as a warrior like Hayley Atwell's Peggy Carter, Lupita Nyong'o's Nakia or Evangeline Lilly's Hope van Dyne but also not a damsel and declared her as the "MJ we both need and deserve". Her personality was reminiscent to Daria Morgendorffer in Daria to some reporters. Rachel Leishman of The Mary Sue described the MCU version of MJ as extremely important in Peter Parker's life.

MJ, alongside Parker and Jacob Batalon's Ned Leeds were described as a "priceless trio" by Pete Hammond of Deadline Hollywood with his review of Spider-Man: No Way Home. The relationship between the three characters in the films were noted as more matured by Brian Lowry of CNN. Sam Machkovech of Ars Technica also praised the trio's chemistry noting that in the second film both MJ and Ned had a rivalry with each other of Peter's relationship but in the third film they were ultimately more bonded together. The chemistry in Spider-Man: No Way Home of MJ and Tom Holland's Parker was praised by RogerEbert.com's Brian Tallerico. Brian opined that the film is the first of the films to let their relationship to shine. He also noted, "she nails the emotional final beats of her character in a way that adds weight to a film that can feel a bit airy in terms of performance." Don Kaye of Den of Geek also praised the chemistry of MJ with Parker and also noted that both she and Batalon "provide gentle comic relief". Jennifer Bisset of CNET described her role as much more to do in the third film and also noted of Zendaya's role being gifted of character growth. Eli Glasner of CBC News described "formerly mopey" MJ as having an stronger footing with Parker in the third film.

Accolades 
Zendaya has received numerous nominations and awards for her portrayal of MJ.

In other media 
A cosmetic outfit based on MJ was added to Fortnite Battle Royale in December 2021 to coincide with the release of Spider-Man: No Way Home, along with an outfit based on Tom Holland's portrayal of Spider-Man.

See also 
 Characters of the Marvel Cinematic Universe

Notes

References

External links
 MJ at Marvel Cinematic Universe Wiki
 
 

Casting controversies in film
Female characters in film
Fictional characters displaced in time
Fictional characters from Queens, New York
Fictional high school students
Fictional Massachusetts Institute of Technology people
Fictional people from the 21st-century
Film characters introduced in 2017
Marvel Cinematic Universe original characters
Spider-Man (2017 film series)
Spider-Man film characters
Teenage characters in film